This was the first edition of the tournament.

Elise Mertens and Aryna Sabalenka won the title, defeating Gabriela Dabrowski and Luisa Stefani in the final, 6–1, 6–3.

Seeds

Draw

Draw

References

External Links
Draw

J&T Banka Ostrava Open - Doubles